Amundsen Glacier is a major Antarctic glacier, about 7 to 11 km (4 to 6 nmi) wide and 150 km (80 nmi) long, originating on the polar plateau where it drains the area to the south and west of Nilsen Plateau, and descending through the Queen Maud Mountains to enter the Ross Ice Shelf just west of the MacDonald Nunataks. The tributary Blackwall Glacier flows northwest along the northeast side of Hansen Spur to join Amundsen Glacier.

It was discovered by Rear Admiral Byrd on the South Pole flight in November 1929. The name was proposed for Roald Amundsen by Laurence Gould, leader of the Byrd AE geological party which sledged past the mouth of the glacier in December 1929.

See also
 List of glaciers in the Antarctic
 Glaciology

References

Glaciers of Amundsen Coast
Queen Maud Mountains